Anna's may refer to:

Anna's hummingbird (Calypte anna)
Anna's Linens, a US retailer of household linens and other home goods
Anna's Swedish Thins, a Swedish gingerbread thin
Anna's Taqueria, a fast-food chain in the Boston area
Anna's Swedish Thins, a brand of cookie manufactured by Lotus Bakeries